In mathematics, in the area of complex analysis, the general difference polynomials are a polynomial sequence, a certain subclass of the Sheffer polynomials, which include the Newton polynomials, Selberg's polynomials, and the Stirling interpolation polynomials as special cases.

Definition
The general difference polynomial sequence is given by

where  is the binomial coefficient.  For , the generated polynomials  are the Newton polynomials

The case of  generates Selberg's polynomials, and the case of  generates Stirling's interpolation polynomials.

Moving differences
Given an analytic function , define the moving difference of f as

where  is the forward difference operator. Then, provided that f obeys certain summability conditions, then it may be represented in terms of these polynomials as

The conditions for summability (that is, convergence) for this sequence is a fairly complex topic; in general, one may say that a necessary condition is that the analytic function be of less than exponential type. Summability conditions are discussed in detail in Boas & Buck.

Generating function
The generating function for the general difference polynomials is given by

This generating function can be brought into the form of the generalized Appell representation 

See also
 Carlson's theorem
 Bernoulli polynomials of the second kind

References

 Ralph P. Boas, Jr. and R. Creighton Buck, Polynomial Expansions of Analytic Functions (Second Printing Corrected), (1964) Academic Press Inc., Publishers New York, Springer-Verlag, Berlin. Library of Congress Card Number 63-23263.

Polynomials
Finite differences
Factorial and binomial topics